Chézy may refer to:

 People
 Antoine de Chézy (1718–1798), French hydraulic engineer
 Antoine-Léonard de Chézy (1773–1832), French orientalist
 Helmina von Chézy (1783–1856), German journalist, poet and playwright

 Communes in France
 Chézy, Allier, in the Allier department
 Chézy-en-Orxois, in the Aisne department
 Chézy-sur-Marne, in the Aisne department

 Other
 Chézy formula, for river flows